The Haldia–Asansol Express is an Express train belonging to Eastern Railway zone that runs between  and  in India. It is currently being operated with 13501/13502 train numbers on six days in a week basis.

Service

The 13501/Haldia–Asansol Express has an average speed of 49 km/hr and covers 324 km in 6h 35m. The 13502/Asansol–Haldia Express has an average speed of 49 km/hr and covers 324 km in 6h 35m.

Route and stops 

The important stops of the train are:

 
 
 
 
 
 
 
 
 
 
 
 
 
 
 
 
 
 Burnpur

Coach composition

The train has standard ICF rakes with max speed of 110 kmph. The train consists of 7 coaches:

 5 General
 2 Seating cum Luggage Rake

Traction

Both trains are hauled by an Asansol Loco Shed-based WAP-4 or WAG-5 type electric locomotive from Haldia to Asansol and back.

Rake sharing

The train shares its rake with 13505/13506 Digha–Asansol Express.

See also 

 Haldia railway station
 Asansol Junction railway station
 Digha–Asansol Express
 Digha–Malda Town Express

Notes

References

External links 

 13501/Haldia - Asansol Express
 13502/Asansol - Haldia Express

Transport in Haldia
Transport in Asansol
Express trains in India
Rail transport in West Bengal
Railway services introduced in 2010